Masteabar was a petty king of western Numidia. He was a son of Gauda, ruler of all Numidia, and brother of Hiempsal II, ruler of eastern Numidia. His existence is known only from a single fragmentary inscription. It seems that Gauda, on his death in 88 BC, divided his kingdom between his sons, Hiempsal receiving the larger part and Masteabar the smaller.

In 81 BC, a rebellious Roman general, Domitius, allied with a Numidian king named Hiarbas, who appears to have displaced the sons of Gauda. The allies were defeated by the Roman general Pompey, Hiempsal being restored to his throne and Masinissa being placed on the western throne. This latter was probably Masteabar's son, and the Roman action indicates that Rome recognised the legitimacy of Masteabar's kingdom.

Masteabar's grandson, Arabio, was the last independent Numidian king in 42 BC.

Notes

Sources

1st-century BC Berber people
Kings of Numidia